Rupert Wells may refer to:

 Rupert Mearse Wells (1835–1902), Canadian politician
 Rupert Wells (rugby league), South African rugby league player